Major-General William Roy  (4 May 17261 July 1790) was a Scottish military engineer, surveyor, and antiquarian. He was an innovator who applied new scientific discoveries and newly emerging technologies to the accurate geodetic mapping of Great Britain. His masterpiece is usually referred to as Roy's Map of Scotland.

It was Roy's advocacy and leadership that led to the creation of the Ordnance Survey in 1791, the year after his death. His technical work in the establishment of a surveying baseline won him the Copley Medal in 1785. His maps and drawings of Roman archaeological sites in Scotland were the first accurate and systematic study of the subject, and have not been improved upon even today. Roy was a fellow of the Royal Society and a member of the Society of Antiquaries of London.

Life and works

Early life and family 
Roy was born at Milton Head in Carluke parish in South Lanarkshire on 4 May 1726.  His father was a factor  in the service of the Gordons/Hamiltons of Hallcraig, as well as an elder of the Kirk. His grandfather had held a similar position as factor, and his uncle acted in that capacity for the Lockharts of Lee. Thus Roy grew up in an environment where making land surveys and using maps was part of the daily business. He was educated in Carluke parish school and then Lanark Grammar School. There is no record of a further education such as that enjoyed by his
younger brother James.

The next few years of his life are poorly documented. Owen and Pilbeam claim
that "Some time after 1738 (when Roy was 12) he moved to Edinburgh and gained experience of surveying and making plans, probably as a civilian draughtsman at the office of the Board of Ordnance at Edinburgh Castle." It is possible that he may have been employed there as a boy because it was normal procedure for the board to employ "cadets" aged ten or eleven who were trained to become civilian surveyors and draughtsmen. Roy was certainly associated with the board by 1746 (aged 20), for he was the author of an official map of Culloden made soon after the battle.

As an employee of the board he would have come to notice of Lieutenant-Colonel David Watson, Deputy Quartermaster-General of the Military District of North Britain for the board, whose headquarters was in Edinburgh. The terms of Roy's employment are unknown but must have some opportunity to undertake private surveys for he was reported as a respected land surveyor employed by the Callander family at their Craigforth estate near Stirling prior to his work for the military.

Roy maintained his connections to his birthplace and the people living there. A servant for the Lockharts of Lee recalled his visits there over time, as his national reputation grew. She noted that at first he would dine in the servants hall, in later years he would dine with the family, and later still he would be seated at the right hand of the Laird.

Monument 

There is a monument to William Roy at the location of his birthplace on Milton Road near Carluke. It is signposted from the junction of Lanark Road and Cartland Avenue. The monument is in the form of a Hotine pillar, a type of trig point. The inscription reads "Here stood Miltonhead the birthplace of Major-General William Roy 4th May 1726 - 30th June 1790 from whose military map of Scotland made in 1747 - 1755 grew the Ordnance Survey of Great Britain".

Principal sources
 Lee (1885–1900) Dictionary of National Biography (1900 edition). 
   The early years of the Ordnance Survey. First published in 1924. Includes some of Roy's letters.
  Map of a Nation: a biography of the Ordnance Survey.
  Ordnance Survey, map makers to Britain since 1791. Available online.
  A History of the Ordnance Survey. The official account. References to original papers. Available online.
  History of the Corps of Royal Engineers. Available online.

Roy as surveyor and soldier

The survey of Scotland

In 1747 Lieutenant-Colonel David Watson, Deputy Quartermaster-General, proposed the compilation of a map of the Scottish Highlands following the Jacobite rising of 1745.
In response, King George II commissioned a military survey of the Highlands, and Watson was placed in charge, under the command of the Duke of Cumberland,  but it fell to Roy "to begin, and afterwards to have a considerable share in, the execution of that map", now known as The Duke of Cumberland's Map.

Roy was without any military rank at this 
time 
but Watson appointed him as an assistant to the quartermaster to provide him some seniority over the group of (typically) six soldiers who travelled with him: an NCO, two end markers, two chainmen and a batman.
From 1749 he was joined by another five junior surveyors for various periods of time: notable among these young assistants were Paul Sandby (born 1731), later renowned for his watercolour landscapes, and a seventeen-year-old David Dundas (born 1735), later Commander-in-Chief of the armed forces.

Eventually there were six teams conducting surveys by traverses of the country with the objects to the side of the line recorded by sketches and compass directions. The Highlands were covered by 1752, but the survey was extended to the lowlands for another three years, until 1755, when most of the engineer surveyors were posted to war stations. In the introduction to the 1885 account of the measurement of the Hounslow baseline Roy writes that the map remained "in an unfinished state ... and is to be considered as a magnificent military sketch rather than a very accurate map of a country  ... (and) it would have been completed, and many of its imperfections no doubt remedied, but for the breaking out of war in 1755."
The eighty-four original field sheets and the thirty-eight divisions of the "fair-protraction"are held in the British Museum together with a small index map and a reduced map of the whole country in a single sheet published as "the King's map". It is now possible to view the map online.

Military appointments
Throughout the Survey of Scotland, Roy was a civilian assistant to David Watson the deputy quartermaster-general, but in 1755 the survey was terminated by the outbreak of the Seven Years' War with France and the consequent redeployment of personnel to more pressing posts in both the regular army and the Board of Ordnance. In the same year the engineers of the board were formed into the Corps of Engineers.  The board officers were members of both structures, for they would be deployed with the army regiments for specialist duties.

In 1776 Roy was commissioned as a lieutenant in the 53rd Foot, a new regiment formed in 1755. At the same time he was appointed as a practitioner-engineer, the lowest rank in the Board of Ordnance survey department, and ensign in the Corps of Engineers. 
Thereafter Roy was promoted steadily, and rapidly, in both structures, but his army rank was always greater than his board rank. For example, he was lieutenant-colonel in the army by 1762 and director and lieutenant-colonel of the Engineers in 1783. He is best known by his army rank of major-general, which he attained in 1781.

From 1786 to his death in 1790, Roy held the position of Colonel of the 30th (Cambridgeshire) Regiment of Foot.

Active service
On the termination of the Scottish survey Roy, now under the jurisdiction of two military bodies, was posted in 1756 to the South of England where he was engaged, together with Watson and Dundas, in inspecting the readiness of coastal military installations in preparation for an expected French invasion. This work involved Roy in the production of plans of fortifications and rough maps of stretches of the south coast: examples are a sketch of the country from Gloucester to Pembroke, with Milford Haven and a sketch of the country betwixt Guildford and Canterbury. These sketches are preserved in the British Library.

By 1757 Roy was with his regiment in France for the Rochefort expedition and then in Germany for the Battle of Minden in 1759. His technical abilities and willingness to innovate brought him to the favourable attention of his commanders.  Preparatory to the battle, the various military engineers made drawings of each step of the coming battle, with each step drawn on a different sheet of paper. The commander could then study the course of the battle before it occurred, going from one sheet to the next. Lieutenant Roy, however, made his drawings on a single sheet with coordinated and accurate overlays, so that the commander could more easily study the course of the battle by examining a single sheet of paper. The commander's comprehension was greatly facilitated, and Roy's methodology was soon adopted as an advancement in military science. Thereafter his promotion was rapid, and by the end of the war in 1763 Roy was a lieutenant colonel in the regiment and director of the engineers of the Board of Ordnance as well as being the deputy quartermaster general for Germany.

Surveyor-general

At the conclusion of the war in 1763 Roy returned to London, where he was based for the rest of his life. The threatened French invasion of the south coast had never materialised, but he felt strongly that the reconnaissances he had made with Watson at the outbreak of the war should be extended to a national survey, not just of the vulnerable south but the whole of the British Isles. He never ceased to champion this cause, but the expense of the Seven Years' War and then the American War of Independence excluded any expenditure on trigonometrical surveys for another twenty years.

In 1765 he was appointed surveyor-general under a royal warrant which directed him "to inspect, survey and make reports from time to time of the state of the coasts of this Kingdom and the islands thereunto belonging." This work, which took him to many parts of Britain and abroad (Ireland and Gibraltar), is recorded in the many plans and sketch maps of districts that are now lodged at the British Library.

Despite the travel Roy was able to enter fully into the intellectual life of London, and in 1767 he became a fellow of the Royal Society.  The only paper he read before the society was in 1783 on Rules for measuring heights with a barometer. Roy was promoted to colonel in 1777, and to major-general in 1781. He was in charge of the departments of the Quartermaster-General and Chief Engineer in 1782, and in 1783 became the director of Royal Engineers.

The Anglo-French survey

Late in life, when he was 57, Roy was granted the opportunity to establish his lasting reputation in the world of geodesy. The opening came from a completely unexpected direction. In 1783 Cassini de Thury addressed a memoir to the Royal Society in which he expressed grave reservations of the measurements of latitude and longitude which had been undertaken at Greenwich Observatory. He suggested that the correct values might be found by combining the Paris Observatory figures with a precise triangulation (survey) between the two observatories. 
Sir Joseph Banks, president of the Royal Society, proposed that Roy should lead the project. Roy accepted with enthusiasm for he saw that apart from the specific measurements proposed the survey could be the first step towards the national survey that he had advocated so often. The whole project is described by Roy in three major contributions to the Philosophical Transactions of the Royal Society  in 
1785,
1787 and
1790.
There are shorter accounts of the project in the History of the Royal Engineers,
the records of the Royal Society
and in every history of the Ordnance Survey.

After a preliminary survey by Roy and three other members of the Society on 16 April, they found a suitable location for the starting baseline on Hounslow Heath, between King's Arbour and Hampton Poor-house just over 5 miles to the south-east. A preliminary measurement of the line was carried out with a steel chain prepared by Jesse Ramsden. It was the intention to measure more accurately with a set of three deal rods about 20 ft. in length but their use had to be abandoned because of their susceptibility to lengthen and shorten in wet weather. The deal rods were replaced by one-inch-thick glass tubes of the same length. The final measurement gives the length of the base as 27404.7 ft. to an accuracy of about 3 inches in 5 miles (or about 1/100,000). The precision of this baseline measurement far exceeded any previous attempts, and in recognition Roy was awarded the Copley medal  by the Royal Society in 1785.

The triangulation itself was delayed until 1787 when Ramsden supplied a new theodolite of unsurpassed accuracy: it could measure angles to within one arc second and therefore detect the curvature of the Earth by measuring the 
spherical excess of the triangles of the survey. By the end of that year he had completed measurements at all but two of the trigonometric stations. Many of the measurements, particularly the cross channel sightings,  were taken at night using intense flares (handled by the artillery). Others required the placing of the instrument on church towers, or even on scaffolded steeples, and in their absence it was sometimes necessary to use a specially constructed portable tower some 30 feet high.

The final report of 1790 presents figures for the distance between Paris and Greenwich as well as the precise latitude, longitude and height of the British triangulation stations. Throughout the survey Roy took every opportunity to fix the position of as many landmarks as possible and these formed the basis of the topographic surveys from which new maps could be prepared. Roy died when only three pages of his final report remained to be proofed.

Roy's scientific legacy

Roy's use of scientific advancements and accurate mathematical formulae paved the way for modern geodesic surveying. His tenure and his work are the dividing line between older, approximate mappings and newer, highly accurate ones in Britain. He is cited repeatedly in early nineteenth-century mathematics textbooks for his use of spherical trigonometry in surveying. 
Early twentieth-century technical books on modern surveying and geodesy include Roy's work as the historical starting point for the modern profession. Perhaps his greatest legacy of all was the work of the Ordnance Survey which commenced in 1791, one year after his death, by extending the basic Anglo-French Survey (1784–1790) to the rest of Great Britain over the following sixty years.

Roy as antiquary

During the Scottish Survey, Roy took careful note of the locations of ancient Roman remains, primarily military camps, wherever he encountered them and these were all marked precisely on the map sheets. This was the beginning of a lifelong interest in ancient Scottish history which he pursued whenever he was travelling the country in his capacity as Surveyor General. 
Roy's maps and his drawings of the relics of the Roman presence in Scotland were immediately seen as credible and valuable. For sites where the Roman remains were later destroyed by human development, his drawings are the only reliable record of their existence.
Roy was the first to systematically map the Antonine Wall and provide accurate and detailed drawings of its remains, an effort undertaken in 1764.

Roy's only historical work, Military Antiquities of the Romans in Britain was published posthumously in 1793. 
This book has a mixed reputation. His drawings and maps are held in the highest regard as still-valuable research sources. However, his efforts in the scholarly discussion of history are widely held to be without value, largely through no fault of his own. This was due to his belief that the spurious text of Charles Bertram De Situ Britanniae was a genuine work, a view shared by virtually all of his contemporaries. Roy consequently adjusted his perspective to be consistent with the history as told in the fraud, causing his own conclusions to be without a valid foundation. Much of Roy's research was devoted to the attempt to follow fictitious journeys throughout Scotland that were described in De Situ Britanniae.

That Roy's considerable talents were partially wasted is a tragedy. He was a Scot with a lifelong interest in ancient Scottish history, and his technical ability and scientific knowledge made him uniquely qualified to provide information in an area of history where knowledge and understanding are minimal. That loss for Scottish history has been bemoaned by Scottish historians. In his introduction to Celtic Scotland, Skene deprecates those historical works based on De Situ, including Roy's, but adds for him alone the comment that " ... perhaps more to be regretted, the valuable work of General Roy ..."

Notes

Bibliography and general references

Roy's major scientific papers

Roy's historical publication

Roy's maps and plans (partial list)
The British Library holds a large collection of Roy's works (at Maps K.Top.48.25-1.a-f.); plans of Roman camps, plans of fortifications and maps of surveys conducted by himself are others. All of these works show Roy to have been an exceptionally neat and capable draughtsman. The principal items include
 Military Survey of Scotland, 1747–1755,
 The Duke of Cumberland's Map (1747),
 A General Description of the South Part of Ireland, or Observations during a Short Tour in Ireland (1766),
 Roman Post at Ardoch, Roman Camp, Dalginross, Genearn, Roman Temple at Netherby, Cumberland, Stratgeth Roman Post, near Innerpeffrey, Strathearn,
 Culloden House, Esk River, Kent, New Romney to North Foreland, Louisbourg, Milford Haven, Coast of Sussex, Southeast part of England, Country between Guildford and Canterbury, Hindhead to Cocking, Lewes Road from Croydon to Chailey, Country from Dorchester to Salisbury, Country from Gloucester to Pembroke, Marden Castle, near Dorchester.

Histories of the Ordnance Survey

General references

Further reading

  – the letter refers to Roy by name as "... our trusty and well beloved Lieutenant-Colonel William Roy, one of our engineers for inspecting, surveying, and making reports from time to time of the state of the coasts and districts of the country adjacent to the coasts of this kingdom, and the islands hereunto belonging."
  – a literary review of Roy's book
  – an early account of the Survey of England
  – a literary review of Roy's book
  – a discussion of Roy's work that won him the Copley Medal.
 
  – the new council of the Royal Society, with "Major Gen. W. Roy" as one of the new members of the council.
 Royal Engineers. Their present website  has a small history section. The previous website (at archive.org) had more information including a biography of Roy. The archived website gives general background information on the Royal Engineers during the time of Roy.

External links 
 
 

|-

1726 births
1790 deaths
British Army generals
Scottish cartographers
Scottish geographers
Scottish non-fiction writers
Scottish soldiers
Fellows of the Royal Society
Fellows of the Society of Antiquaries of London
Fellows of the Royal Society of Edinburgh
Recipients of the Copley Medal
People from Carluke
Scottish antiquarians
Scottish engineers
Scottish surveyors
18th-century Scottish people
Royal Engineers officers
People educated at Lanark Grammar School
18th-century geographers
British Army personnel of the Seven Years' War